Chaos is a rendering and simulation software developer headquartered in Karlsruhe, Germany and Sofia, Bulgaria. It was founded in 1997 by Peter Mitev and Vladimir Koylazov. Chaos is best known for the development of V-Ray. In 2022, it merged with Enscape, with the resulting company keeping the Chaos brand.

History 
Chaos was founded in 1997 in Sofia, Bulgaria as Chaos Group by Peter Mitev and Vladimir Koylazov. The company released its first product, fire and smoke simulation software Phoenix, then called Phoenix FD. In 2002, it released the first version of 3D rendering software V-Ray. In 2017, Vladimir Koylazov, then CTO of Chaos, received a Scientific and Engineering Award from the Academy of Motion Picture Arts and Sciences for his work on V-Ray. In 2021, Chaos went on to win an Engineering Emmy Award from the National Academy of Television Arts and Sciences for their work on it. Other products released by Chaos include Cosmos, Vantage, Scans and Cloud, most of them tying into V-Ray.

In 2017, the company acquired Czech software developer Render Legion, known for Corona Renderer, later rebranding the subsidiary to Chaos Czech. As part of a larger rebranding effort by Chaos, Corona Renderer was rebranded to Chaos Corona in 2022, bringing it in line with the rest of the company's products.

In 2021, the company rebranded from Chaos Group to Chaos. In January 2022, the company merged with German software developer Enscape, with the resulting company maintaining the Chaos brand. 

Following the merger, Chaos acquired Danish 3D product visualization platform developer Cylindo in April. In May, the company acquired architectural visualization website CGarchitect, best known for their 3D Awards program. As part of the latter purchase, all paid features of the newly acquired website were made available to all accounts for free.

References

External links 
 

2022 mergers and acquisitions
Companies established in 1997
Software companies of Bulgaria
Companies based in Sofia